Jerry City is a village in Wood County, Ohio, United States. The population was 427 at the 2010 census.

History
The first settlement at Jerry City was made in the early 1860s; it was then called Stulltown and later Shiloh. The town site was replatted in 1872 as Jerry City, after Jerry Nestlerode, a local businessperson. A post office  has been in operation in the village since 1872. The village was incorporated in 1875.

Geography

Demographics

2010 census
As of the census of 2010, there were 427 people, 162 households, and 113 families living in the village. The racial makeup of the village was 99.3% White, 0.5% Native American, and 0.2% from other races. Hispanic or Latino of any race were 5.2% of the population.

There were 162 households, of which 34.6% had children under the age of 18 living with them, 53.1% were married couples living together, 9.9% had a female householder with no husband present, 6.8% had a male householder with no wife present, and 30.2% were non-families. 24.1% of all households were made up of individuals, and 11.1% had someone living alone who was 65 years of age or older. The average household size was 2.64 and the average family size was 3.16.

The median age in the village was 37.9 years. 26.5% of residents were under the age of 18; 9.4% were between the ages of 18 and 24; 24.9% were from 25 to 44; 28.2% were from 45 to 64; and 11.2% were 65 years of age or older. The gender makeup of the village was 50.1% male and 49.9% female.

2000 census
As of the census of 2000, there were 453 people, 160 households, and 124 families living in the village. The population density was 449.9 people per square mile (173.2/km2). There were 170 housing units at an average density of 168.8 per square mile (65.0/km2). The racial makeup of the village was 99.56% White, and 0.44% from two or more races. Hispanic or Latino of any race were 1.99% of the population.

There were 160 households, out of which 36.3% had children under the age of 18 living with them, 60.0% were married couples living together, 6.9% had a female householder with no husband present, and 22.5% were non-families. 19.4% of all households were made up of individuals, and 7.5% had someone living alone who was 65 years of age or older. The average household size was 2.83 and the average family size was 3.17.

In the village, the population was spread out, with 28.5% under the age of 18, 8.8% from 18 to 24, 30.5% from 25 to 44, 23.0% from 45 to 64, and 9.3% who were 65 years of age or older. The median age was 33 years. For every 100 females there were 104.1 males. For every 100 females age 18 and over, there were 105.1 males.

The median income for a household in the village was $40,556, and the median income for a family was $46,667. Males had a median income of $33,438 versus $25,000 for females. The per capita income for the village was $16,527. About 5.8% of families and 9.8% of the population were below the poverty line, including 7.7% of those under age 18 and 7.3% of those age 65 or over.

References

Villages in Wood County, Ohio
Villages in Ohio